Madeline Kathryn Brewer (born May 1, 1992) is an American actress. She is known for her role as Tricia Miller in the Emmy award-winning series Orange Is the New Black (2013), her role in Hemlock Grove (2014–2015), and her lead role as Alice/Lola in the Netflix horror film Cam. She stars as Janine Lindo in the Hulu series The Handmaid's Tale (2017–present), which earned her an Emmy nomination for Outstanding Supporting Actress in a Drama Series.

Early life
Brewer grew up in Pitman, New Jersey, the daughter of actor and musician Laurie and Mark Brewer. In 2009, she starred in her high school musical The Wiz as Dorothy. She was crowned Miss Pitman the following year. Brewer is a graduate of the American Musical and Dramatic Academy in New York City.

Career
Brewer began her career after portraying Tricia Miller in the original Netflix series Orange Is the New Black. In 2016, she appeared in "Men Against Fire", an episode of the anthology series Black Mirror. In 2018, she portrayed the main character of Alice/Lola in the Netflix psychological horror film Cam. She has starred in the Hulu original series The Handmaid's Tale as Janine Lindo since 2017.
She is currently starring as Sally Bowles in the London West End production of Cabaret.

Filmography

Film

Television

References

External links

1992 births
Actresses from New Jersey
American television actresses
Living people
People from Pitman, New Jersey
21st-century American actresses